Femme is a 2023 British thriller film directed by Sam H. Freeman and Ng Choon Ping in their feature debut. It is a feature-length adaptation of their BAFTA-nominated 2021 short film of the same name. It premiered at the 73rd Berlin International Film Festival.

Cast
 Nathan Stewart-Jarrett as Jules
 George Mackay as Preston
 Aaron Heffernan
 John McCrea as Toby
 Asha Reid as Alicia
 Peter Clements
 Antonia Clarke as Molly
 Moe Bar-El as Donovan

Production
Harris Dickinson and Paapa Essiedu led the 2021 short. In May 2022, it was announced George Mackay and Nathan Stewart-Jarrett would lead the forthcoming feature-length adaptation. Directors Sam H. Freeman and Ng Choon Ping credit producer Sam Ritzenberg and Agile Films founder Myles Payne helping them get the idea off the ground when they originally boarded the short.

Release
A trailer was released ahead of the film's Berlinale premiere.

References

External links
 

2023 LGBT-related films
BBC Film films
British films about revenge
British LGBT-related films
Drag (clothing)-related films
Features based on short films
Films set in London
LGBT-related thriller films